Beast is a 1991 novel by Peter Benchley, the author of Jaws.

Plot
A fishing community in Bermuda is disrupted by a series of mysterious disappearances at sea. Veteran fisherman Whip Darling suspects the truth, and after discovering two large hooks advises confidant Marcus Sharpe, a local Navy pilot, that the culprit is Architeuthis dux: a giant squid.

A marine biologist called Talley also guesses the truth after the latest disaster, and convinces the millionaire father (Manning) of two of the victims to fund a hunt for the creature. The local mayor attempts to overrule all parties and participates in an exploratory mission on a mini-submarine, but is killed when the creature destroys the vessel. Darling's crewmate also perishes.

Although reluctant to participate any further, Darling is blackmailed when Manning assumes ownership of his outstanding mortgage. Darling, Sharpe, Talley and Manning embark on a new hunt, although Manning is later killed in an accident. The creature is attracted by  hormones Talley cultivated from a dead giant squid, and threatens to sink their vessel. Darling wounds the creature, and its struggling attracts a sperm whale, which kills the squid.

Returning to land, the group are oblivious to the fact that some of the squid's spawn have survived and due to overfishing will grow to adulthood unchallenged.

Adaptation
Beast was adapted into a TV movie called The Beast in 1996, starring William Petersen as Whip Dalton (name change from Darling). Aside from an altered ending with the squid being killed by an explosion instead of a whale, Marcus's character being female, Manning being unrelated to any of the squid's victims and only wanting it as an exhibit for an ocean park, Whip's teenaged daughter having a subplot, and the setting being changed from Bermuda to the Pacific Northwest, the film is regarded as very faithful to the source material. The film was well received and earned high ratings, both earning a nomination in the Daytime Emmy Awards and encouraging future adaptations of Benchley's other works, such as White Shark being adapted as Creature in 1998.

See also 
Giant squid in popular culture
Jaws (novel)

References

1991 American novels
Random House books
American novels adapted into films
Novels by Peter Benchley
Books about cephalopods
American novels adapted into television shows
Nautical novels
Giant squid